Chloroclystis celidota is a moth in the family Geometridae. It was described by Turner in 1931. It is found in Australia (Queensland) and on Dunk Island.

References

External links

Moths described in 1931
celidota
Moths of Australia